St. Mark Senior Secondary Public School, Meera Bagh, is a co-educational English medium institution, inaugurated by the then Lt.Governor of Delhi, Air Chief Marshal Arjan Singh on 20 April 1990. It has a strength of 3800 students.

Academics
Recognized by the Delhi Administration, the school follows the CBSE Syllabus. It has laboratories, a library, computers, Audio-visual facilities, a play field for all the major games (cricket, football, basketball), NCC & Scouts, hobby clubs, and co-curricular activities like camping and educational excursions.

In addition to the above, there is a Maths laboratory, and Resource Rooms for English, Hindi, Sanskrit and Psychology.

Notable alumni
 Shikhar Dhawan - cricket player
 Karan Wahi - actor, anchor and model
 Barun Sobti - actor and model
 Priyanka Bassi - actress
 Raashi Khanna  - actress

See also
St. Mark's Senior Secondary School, Janakpuri
Education in India
List of schools in India
List of schools in Delhi affiliated with CBSE

References 

Schools in West Delhi
High schools and secondary schools in Delhi
1975 establishments in Delhi